The Lex Acilia de intercalando (Latin for "The Acilian Law on Intercalation") was a Roman law introduced by the consul M. Acilius Glabrio and enacted in 191BC. Its content is unclear, but it dealt with intercalation in the Roman calendar.

Context
The state of the Roman calendar during this period is uncertain. Roman mythology traced the Republican calendar of 355 days to Numa, the city's second king, and also credited him with the establishment of some kind of intercalation to keep it aligned with the solar year. Some authors even credited him with use of the 19-year Metonic cycle. There is evidence, however, that the Romans long continued their early and unattested lunar calendar even after the establishment of the Republic. Varro cites instances of intercalation at least as early as the 5th century BC. Alternatively, intercalation is sometimes said to have begun with the decemviri, who may have adopted either Etruscan or Greek practices. Fulvius claims the Acilian Law was the first to authorize any intercalation.

Contents
The details of the law are uncertain, but it seems to have placed the decision whether or not to intercalate a month into the year with the College of Pontiffs.

See also
 Roman Law 
 List of Roman laws

References

External links
The Roman Law Library, incl. Leges

Chris Bennett's reconstruction of Lex Acilia, see Acilian reform of 191 under General Topics

191 BC
2nd century BC in law
Roman law
2nd century BC in the Roman Republic